Anomoeotes is a genus of moths in the Anomoeotidae family.

Species
Anomoeotes diaphana Hering, 1932
Anomoeotes elegans Pagenstecher, 1903
Anomoeotes infuscata Talbot, 1929
Anomoeotes instabilis Talbot, 1929
Anomoeotes leucolena Holland, 1893
Anomoeotes levis Felder, 1888
Anomoeotes nigrivenosus Butler, 1893
Anomoeotes nox Aurivillius, 1907
Anomoeotes nuda Holland, 1897
Anomoeotes phaeomera Hampson, 1920
Anomoeotes separatula Strand, 1913
Anomoeotes simulatrix Talbot, 1929
Anomoeotes tenellula Holland, 1893
Anomoeotes triangularis Jordan, 1907

References

Anomoeotidae
Zygaenoidea genera